= Federation of Motorsports Clubs of Uganda =

The Federation of Motorsport Clubs of Uganda, abbreviated as FMU, is the national governing body responsible for regulating and promoting motorsport activities in Uganda. It oversees the organization, administration, and development of various motorsport disciplines, including rallying, autocross, motocross, and other sanctioned competitions.

FMU is affiliated with the National Council of Sports (NCS), the government body mandated to regulate sporting activities in Uganda. It is also a member of the Fédération Internationale de l'Automobile (FIA), the international governing organization for motorsport and mobility. Through these affiliations, FMU operates in accordance with national and international motorsport regulations and standards.

== Location ==
Federation of Motorsport Clubs of Uganda (FMU) Headquarters, Lugogo Sports Complex (Lugogo Indoor Stadium), off Sir Hesketh Bell Road, Kampala, Uganda.

== Role ==
Responsible for organizing, regulating, and promoting motorsport in Uganda. It oversees the planning and administration of motorsport events and ensures that competitions are conducted in accordance with national and international regulations.

FMU supervises eight motorsport disciplines, including rally, autocross, motocross, karting, sprint, time trial, drifting, and other sanctioned events. The federation works to develop motorsport by promoting safety, fair competition, driver development, and public participation while representing Uganda in international motorsport through its affiliation with the Fédération Internationale de l'Automobile (FIA).

== See also ==
- Federation of Uganda Football Associations
